is a Japanese former long jumper who competed in the 1968 Summer Olympics.

References

1944 births
Living people
Japanese male long jumpers
Japanese male sprinters
Olympic male long jumpers
Olympic male sprinters
Olympic athletes of Japan
Athletes (track and field) at the 1968 Summer Olympics
Asian Games gold medalists for Japan
Asian Games gold medalists in athletics (track and field)
Athletes (track and field) at the 1970 Asian Games
Medalists at the 1970 Asian Games
Universiade silver medalists for Japan
Universiade medalists in athletics (track and field)
Medalists at the 1967 Summer Universiade
Japan Championships in Athletics winners
20th-century Japanese people
21st-century Japanese people